Ahmed Dhagah District is a district in Hargeisa, Somaliland. It is one of the eight administrative districts of Hargeisa City.

See also
Administrative divisions of Somaliland
Regions of Somaliland
Districts of Somaliland

References

Districts of Hargeisa